The Kosovo Athletic Federation (/ ) is the governing body for the sport of athletics in Kosovo.

The Kosovo Athletic Federation admitted to IAAF as a provisional member "with full rights and obligations" on 15 April 2015 and granted full membership on 19 August 2015 with 187 members voting in favour and 13 against.

Affiliations 
International Association of Athletics Federations (IAAF)
European Athletic Association (EAA)
Olympic Committee of Kosovo

National records 
FAK maintains the Kosovan records in athletics.

See also
Kosovo at the World Athletics Championships
Kosovo at the European Athletics Championships

References

External links 
Official webpage 

Kosovo
Sports governing bodies in Kosovo
National governing bodies for athletics